Ekati may refer to:

Ekati Diamond Mine, in Canada's Northwest Territories
Ekati Airport, that serves the diamond mine